The 1947 Soviet football championship was the 15th seasons of competitive football in the Soviet Union and the 9th among teams of sports societies and factories. CDKA Moscow again won the championship becoming the Soviet domestic champions for the second time.

The defending champions CDKA allowed their Moscow rivals Dinamo to take a lead early in a season but managed to catch. The fate of title was decided in the last round, after which CDKA won the season title based on a goal ratio.

Honours

Notes = Number in parentheses is the times that club has won that honour. * indicates new record for competition

Soviet Union football championship

First Group

Second Group

Subgroup Center

Subgroup Russia West

Subgroup Russia East

Subgroup Ukraine

Subgroup Caucasus

Central Asia

Tier final

Top goalscorers

1st Group
Vsevolod Bobrov (CDKA Moscow), Valentin Nikolaev (CDKA Moscow), Sergei Solovyev (Dinamo Moscow) – 14 goals

2nd Group
Andrei Zazroyev (Krylia Sovetov Molotov) – 12 goals

Republican level
Football competitions of union republics

Football championships
 Azerbaijan SSR – Trudovye Rezervy Baku
 Armenian SSR – Dinamo Yerevan
 Belarusian SSR – Torpedo Minsk (see Football Championship of the Belarusian SSR)
 Estonian SSR – Dinamo Tallin
 Georgian SSR – Dinamo Sukhumi
 Kazakh SSR – Lokomotiv Dzhambul
 Karelo-Finish SSR – unknown
 Kirgiz SSR – none
 Latvian SSR – Daugava Liepaja
 Lithuanian SSR – Lokomotiv Kaunas
 Moldavian SSR – Spartak Tiraspol
 Russian SFSR – none
 Tajik SSR – none
 Turkmen SSR – Spartak Ashkhabad
 Uzbek SSR – none
 Ukrainian SSR – Bilshovyk Mukachevo (see Football Championship of the Ukrainian SSR)

Football cups
 Azerbaijan SSR – Pischevik Baku
 Armenian SSR – Dinamo Yerevan
 Belarusian SSR – Torpedo Minsk
 Estonian SSR – Dinamo Tallin
 Georgian SSR – Dinamo Batumi
 Kazakh SSR – none
 Karelo-Finish SSR – unknown
 Kirgiz SSR – Burevestnik Frunze
 Latvian SSR – Daugava Liepaja
 Lithuanian SSR – Lokomotiv Kaunas
 Moldavian SSR – Dinamo Kishinev
 Russian SFSR – Dinamo Khabarovsk
 Tajik SSR – ODO Stalinabad
 Turkmen SSR – Dinamo Ashkhabad
 Uzbek SSR – Pischevik Tashkent
 Ukrainian SSR – FC Dynamo Kyiv (see 1947 Cup of the Ukrainian SSR)

References

External links
 1947 Soviet football championship. RSSSF